Dixie, Oregon may refer to one of these locations in the U.S. state of Oregon:

Dixie, Baker County, Oregon, a former community and post office
Dixie, Grant County, Oregon, a former station on the Sumpter Valley Railway
Dixie, Klamath County, Oregon, a historic locale
Dixie, a nickname for the Polk County community of Rickreall, Oregon during the U.S. Civil war and some time after
Dixie, Washington County, Oregon, a populated place and former post office